John Anthony Moloney (born 12 June 1953) is a former Irish Fianna Fáil politician. He was a Teachta Dála (TD) for the Laois–Offaly constituency from 1997 to 2011. He also served as a Minister of State from 2008 to 2011.

An air traffic controller, undertaker and publican before entering politics, he is a former member of Laois County Council and Mountmellick Town Council. Moloney was first elected to Dáil Éireann at the 1997 general election and retained his seat at the 2002 and 2007 general elections.

On 13 May 2008, shortly after Brian Cowen became Taoiseach, he was appointed as Minister of State at the Department of Health and Children with special responsibility for Disability Issues and Mental Health, and was also responsible for Equality affairs until March 2009.

He lost his seat at the 2011 general election.

References

1953 births
Living people
Air traffic controllers
Drinking establishment owners
Fianna Fáil TDs
Irish funeral directors
Local councillors in County Laois
Members of the 28th Dáil
Members of the 29th Dáil
Members of the 30th Dáil
Ministers of State of the 30th Dáil
Politicians from County Laois